Massachusetts House of Representatives' 5th Bristol district in the United States is one of 160 legislative districts included in the lower house of the Massachusetts General Court. It covers part of Bristol County. Democrat Pat Haddad of Somerset has represented the district since 2001.

Towns represented
The district includes the following localities:
 Dighton
 Somerset
 part of Swansea
 part of Taunton

The current district geographic boundary overlaps with those of the Massachusetts Senate's 1st Bristol and Plymouth and 1st Plymouth and Bristol districts.

Former locales
The district previously covered:
 Berkley, circa 1872, 1927 
 Freetown, circa 1927 
 Rehoboth, circa 1872, 1927 
 Seekonk, circa 1872, 1927

Representatives
 Joel Marble, circa 1858 
 John C. Marvel, circa 1859 
 Isaac B. Tompkins, circa 1888 
 Rufus H. Willis, circa 1888 
 Albert C. Goff, circa 1920 
 Stephen L. French, circa 1951 
 Raymond S. Peck, circa 1975 
 Manuel Raposa, circa 1978
 Joan Menard, 1979–2000
 Patricia A. Haddad, 2001-current

See also
 List of Massachusetts House of Representatives elections
 Other Bristol County districts of the Massachusetts House of Representatives: 1st, 2nd, 3rd, 4th, 6th, 7th, 8th, 9th, 10th, 11th, 12th, 13th, 14th
 List of Massachusetts General Courts
 List of former districts of the Massachusetts House of Representatives

Images

References

External links
 Ballotpedia
  (State House district information based on U.S. Census Bureau's American Community Survey).

House
Government of Bristol County, Massachusetts